Jeaffreson may refer to:

Jeaffreson Vennor Brewer (1853–1924), rugby union international, represented England in 1875
Jeaffreson Greswell (1916–2000), British pilot during the Second World War
Edward Jeaffreson Jackson (born 1862), Australian architect in the Arts and Crafts style
David Jeaffreson, CBE, JP (1931–2008), British colonial government official and civil servant
John Cordy Jeaffreson (1831–1901), English novelist and author of popular non-fiction

See also
Geferson
Jefferson (disambiguation)